Minióng Álvarez (born 1917) was a character supporting actor from the Philippines who made several movies starting from his original home studio LVN Pictures.  The actor had Strabismus or cross-eye problem, which helped him get comedic roles.  He also did non-comedic roles usually as a father or a poor farmer.

Filmography

Pag-asa (1951)
Talisman (1951)
Probinsiyano (1951)
Bohemyo (1951)
Harana sa Karagatan (1952)
Rodrigo de Villa (1952)
Kuwintas ng Pasakit (1953)
Pintor Kulapol (1953)
Krus na Bakal (1954)
Kandelerong Pilak (1954)
Ikaw ang Dahilan (1954)
Doce Pares (1954)
Talusaling (1955)
Banda Uno (1955)
Mariang Sinukuan (1955)
Casa Grande (1958)
Balae (1958)
Ay Pepita! (1958)
Walang Takot (1958)
Nukso nang Nukso (1959)
Kundiman ng Lahi (1959)
Tres Mosqueteros (1960)
Batas ng .45 (1965)
Not for Hire (1966)
Alyas Don Juan (1966)
Mariang Kondesa (1966)
Napoleon Doble and the Sexy Six (1966)
Zoom-Zoom Apollo (1969)
Men of Action Meet Women of Dracula (1969)
D' Musical Teenage Idols! (1969)
Totoy Guwapo (1970)
Ang Pangalan Ko'y Luray (1971)
Kapitan Kulas (1975)
Bergado (Terror of Cavite) (1976)
Ang Lihim ni Rosa Henson sa Buhay ni Kumander Lawin (1976)
Bertong Suklab (1976)
Gulapa (Ang barakong mayor ng Maragondon)
Pagputi and Uwak, Pag-itim ng Tagak (1978)
Buhay Artista Ngayon (1979)
Tonyong Bayawak (1979)
Pepeng Kuryente (1988)
Bala...Dapat kay Cris Cuenca, Public Enemy no. 1 (1989)
Greggy en' Boogie: Sakyan Mo Na Lang, Anna (1994)
Tar-San (1999)

References
Notes

External links

Filipino male film actors
Year of death missing
1917 births